Abdul Hafeez Kardar PP, HI  (17 January 1925 – 21 April 1996) was a Pakistani cricketer, politician and diplomat. He was the first captain of the Pakistan cricket team. He is one of the only three players to have played Test cricket for both India and Pakistan.

He also served as the member of the Provincial Assembly of the Punjab and remained Punjab Minister for Food under the Bhutto government.

He married twice, once to an English woman, Helen Rosemary Hastilow, the daughter of the Warwickshire County Cricket Club chairman Cyril Hastilow and also to a Pakistani woman, Shahzadi, sister of Pakistani cricketer Zulfiqar Ahmed. He has at least one son, the economist Shahid Hafeez Kardar.

He captained the Pakistan cricket team in its first 23 Test matches from 1952 to 1958 and was later the nation's leading cricket administrator. He is widely regarded as the father figure of Pakistan cricket. He received the Pride of Performance Award from the Government of Pakistan in 1958.

Early career
Kardar was born in a famous Kardar Arain family of Lahore, Punjab in 1925, and educated at Islamia College, Lahore and University College, Oxford. He played domestic cricket for a variety of teams, including Oxford University, Northern India and Muslims. He was one of the few players of his generation who played for India in Tests against England, and following the independence of Pakistan, representing Pakistan.  Kardar was appointed to lead the team which would play its first official Test series touring India in 1952–53. Kardar fielded his men against Lala Amarnath's Indian team. Although India won in Delhi and Bombay and won the series, Kardar's Pakistani team achieved their first Test victory in only the second Test in Lucknow.

He was a left-handed batsman and a slow left-arm orthodox spin bowler, scoring 6,832 runs and taking 344 wickets in first-class cricket. He averaged 29.83 in batting, and 24.55 in bowling. Kardar played for the Pakistan team from 1948 to 1952, in the years before Pakistan was granted Test status. Kardar also played for Warwickshire and Pakistan Services.

Pakistan's captain
Kardar captained Pakistan against all the Test playing nations of the day, and achieved an unparalleled distinction of leading his team to victory against each of them, which was remarkable for a nascent cricketing nation. Especially famous was the series-levelling victory achieved touring England in 1954 at The Oval. Kardar and his men also created history by winning the first-ever and only Test against Australia in Karachi in 1957. Although aggressive, motivated and confident, Kardar's Pakistan was yet immature, inexperienced and raw in their cricketing skills to win series victories. The attitude of the players was especially criticised when all the five Tests played by the Indian cricket team on its first tour of Pakistan in 1954–55 ended in a draw. The fear of both Indian and Pakistani players of losing to each other, owing to political tensions and the bloody legacy of independence, was too much for competitive cricket to be played. During his tenure, Pakistan won six, lost six and drew eleven matches in a total of 23 Tests. In all his positions of authority, he was inclined to be dictatorial and quickly angered, especially by any hint of criticism. But he was also a visionary and was an advocate of neutral umpires. Kardar retired from international Test cricket in 1958.

Later career
Kardar had been a strong supporter of Mohammad Ali Jinnah and an adherent to the idea of Muslim glory in India. Abdul Hafeez Kardar went into politics and served as the president of the Pakistan Cricket Board from 1972 to 1977. His tenure was notable for increasing representation of Asian and African cricketing nations with the International Cricket Council. Kardar was forced to resign after an embarrassing pay dispute with the players in 1977. He also worked with many charitable and social development causes, and in the last years of his life was Pakistan's ambassador to Switzerland, prior to his death in his hometown, Lahore in 1996. Kardar is today credited with popularising cricket among Pakistani people, for his tutelage of some of Pakistan's greatest cricketers, young talent and prodigies, and his stewardship of the Pakistan team and the board in its early years, developing a culture of pride and professionalism. He was also elected to the provincial assembly of Punjab in 1970 on a ticket of the Pakistan Peoples Party (PPP), and served in the provincial cabinet as a minister.

Tribute
In 2019, he was featured as a Google Doodle on what would have been his 94th birthday.

Awards and recognition
Pride of Performance Award in 1958 by the President of Pakistan In 2012, he was posthumously awarded Hilal-i-Imtiaz in recognition of contribution to Pakistan's cricket.

In 2012, he was awarded the Sitara-e-Imtiaz, Pakistan's third-highest civilian award, for his contributions to the country's cricket team.

Books by A.H. Kardar
 Inaugural Test Matches (1954)
 Test Status on Trial (1954)
 Green Shadows (1958)
 People's Commitment (1971)
 The Cricket Conspiracy (1977)
 Is the Economic Future of Our Youth Become? (1985)
 Bangladesh: The Price of Political Failure (1985)
 Memoirs of an All-rounder (1987)
 Pakistan's Soldiers of Fortune (1988)
 An Ambassador's Diary (1994)
 Failed Expectations (1995)

See also
 List of cricketers who have played for more than one international team

References

External links
 

1925 births
1996 deaths
India Test cricketers
Pakistan Test cricketers
Ambassadors of Pakistan to Switzerland
Pakistan Test cricket captains
Dual international cricketers
Commonwealth XI cricketers
Government Islamia College alumni
Indian cricketers
Warwickshire cricketers
Oxford University cricketers
Gentlemen cricketers
Pakistan People's Party MPAs (Punjab)
Recipients of the Pride of Performance
Combined Services (Pakistan) cricketers
Northern India cricketers
North Zone cricketers
Muslims cricketers
Cricketers from Lahore
Cricket historians and writers
Alumni of University College, Oxford
Pakistan Cricket Board Presidents and Chairmen
Punjab MPAs 1972–1977
Pakistani sportsperson-politicians
Pakistani cricketers
Provincial ministers of Punjab
Punjabi people
People from Lahore
Pakistani cricket administrators